KBNL (branded as Radio Manantial) is a  Christian Spanish Talk format FM radio station that serves the Laredo, Texas, United States and Nuevo Laredo, Tamaulipas, Mexico border area.

External links
KBNL Official Web Site

BNL
BNL
BNL
Radio stations established in 1985
1985 establishments in Texas